Maluj or Malooga is a leavened Yemeni flatbread eaten with bean dishes, scrambled eggs, spiced buttermilk, and many other Yemeni savory dishes.

Yemeni cuisine
Flatbreads
Yeast breads